Anannya Nattya Goshthi is a Bengali theatre group. The group is located in Chandpur, Bangladesh, and was founded on 24 October 1974.

Productions 

(in alphabetical order)
 Ingit

References 

Bengali theatre groups
Theatre companies in Bangladesh